Maura K. Johnston  (born May 28, 1975) is a writer, editor and music critic. A member of Boston College's journalism faculty, she has written for Rolling Stone, The Boston Globe, Pitchfork, The Awl, The New York Times, Spin and The Guardian. She is working on a critical biography of Madonna for the Harlequin Enterprises subsidiary Hanover Square Press.

Johnston was a founding editor of Gawker Media's Idolator, where she worked until November 2009. In April 2011, she became the music editor of The Village Voice, holding that position until September 2012. In 2013, she launched the culture periodical Maura Magazine, which was published by 29th Street Publishing through 2015.

She currently is an adjunct professor at Boston College, which named her the inaugural Institute for Liberal Arts Journalism Fellow in 2013. From 2010 to 2013, she taught at New York University's Clive Davis Institute of Recorded Music.

Johnston is involved with Boston College's non-commercial radio station WZBC as a DJ and advisory board member and has DJed at WNUR and WPRB. She has discussed music and popular culture on NPR, WNYC, WBUR and CBC Radio. She has appeared in a handful of music videos, including Speedy Ortiz's "The Graduates", and contributed violin and viola to records by artists including Lefty's Deceiver and Kincaid.

A native of Hicksville, New York, Johnston graduated from Northwestern University in 1997.

References

External links
 Personal website
 Rolling Stone archive
 Boston Globe archive
 Pitchfork archive
 The Guardian archive

American women journalists
American music critics
Northwestern University alumni
New York University faculty
Boston College faculty
1975 births
Living people
People from Hicksville, New York
Journalists from New York (state)
Women writers about music
American women music critics
20th-century American non-fiction writers
20th-century American women writers
21st-century American non-fiction writers
21st-century American women writers
The Village Voice people
American women academics